Post-GPI attachment to proteins 1 is a protein that in humans is encoded by the PGAP1 gene.

Function

The protein encoded by this gene functions early in the glycosylphosphatidylinositol (GPI) biosynthetic pathway, catalyzing the inositol deacylation of GPI. The encoded protein is required for the production of GPI that can attach to proteins, and this may be an important factor in the transport of GPI-anchored proteins from the endoplasmic reticulum to the Golgi. Defects in this gene are a cause of mental retardation, autosomal recessive 42.

References

Further reading 

Human proteins